A power of 10 is any of the integer powers of the number ten; in other words, ten multiplied by itself a certain number of times.

Power of 10, Power of ten, or Powers of Ten may refer to:

Power of 10 (American game show), an American television show about guessing poll results
Power of 10 (Australian game show), a television show based on the American show
Power of 10 (Philippine game show), a television show based on the American show
Power of Ten (album), by Chris de Burgh
Powers of Ten (film), a 1968 short documentary film about the relative scale of the Universe, re-released in 1977
Powers of Ten (album), by Shawn Lane
Power of 10, weight-training method and book by Adam Zickerman
The Power of 10: Rules for Developing Safety-Critical Code, a set of rules for reliable software
Powers of Ten, a 2015 album by Stephan Bodzin
Power of 10, the site for UK Athletics ranking and statistics